The National Library of Algeria (in Arabic: المكتبة الوطنيّة الجزائريّة) has been in existence since Independence in the 1960s and it was modeled after a large administrative library that was established in 1835 by the French colonial authorities. A new building, constructed in the 1990s to house the million or so volumes of the national library, also enabled the library to considerably develop its services. Algeria's scientific and technical information needs are ensured by two organizations, the Centre for Technical and Scientific Information and Technology Transfer, the Algerian equivalent of the INIS network, and the National Social and Economic Documentation Centre, established in 1971, which ensures the selection and indexing of automated documentation on the social and economic development of the country and the collection of statistical data.

It can accommodate more than 2,500 readers at a time. It is the legal deposit and copyright for Algeria.

Administrators - directors 
Adrien Berbrugger (1835-1869)
Oscar Mac Carthy (1869-1891)
Émile Maupas (1891-1916)
 M. Bojeron, par délégation (1916-1920)
Gabriel Esquer (1920-1948)
 Germaine Lebel (1948-1962)
 Mahmoud-Agha Bouayed (1962-1991)
Amin Zaoui (2002-2008)
Azzedine Mihoubi (2010-2013)
 Dahmane Abdelmadjid (20??-2015)
 Yasser Arafat Gana (2015-2017)
 Hayet Gouni (2017-

See also
 Centre Nationale des Archives (Algeria)

References

Bibliography
  (Includes national library)
  
  (Includes information about the national library)
  (Describes efforts of the national library)

External links
 Official site  

1835 establishments in Algeria
Libraries in Algeria
Public libraries in Algeria
State libraries of Algeria
Buildings and structures in Algiers
Libraries established in 1835
Government buildings in Algeria
Algeria
Library buildings completed in 1994
Education in Algiers
19th-century architecture in Algeria
20th-century architecture in Algeria